Over It is an EP by American punk rock band Face to Face, released in 1994 on Victory Music, a subsidiary of a major label, not the similarly named Chicago-based Victory Records. It contains remixes of songs released on 1992's Don't Turn Away as well as original material. The EP also features the first appearance of Chad Yaro on accompanying rhythm guitar, thus 'filling out' the sound, according to front man Trever Keith. By request of the band, the EP is no longer in print.

Track listing

References

1994 EPs
Face to Face (punk band) albums